Tsewang Rabtan (from  Tsewang Rapten; ; ; 1643–1727) was a Choros (Oirats) prince and the Khong Tayiji of the Dzungar Khanate from 1697 (following the death of his uncle and rival Galdan Boshugtu Khan) until his death in 1727. He was married to Lha-bzang Khan's sister.

Political and military action
Tsewang Rabtan married his daughter, Boitalak, to Danjung, the eldest son of Lha-bzang Khan in 1714. He used the occasion to destroy some of Lha-bzang's troops in preparation for an invasion of Tibet.  He consolidated Dzungar power by 1715, and in 1717 sent one army of 300 into Amdo to retrieve the 7th Dalai Lama, planning to consolidate Tibetan support by bringing him to Lhasa, and another army of 6000, led by his brother Tseren Dondub, that successfully took Lhasa from the Khoshut and killed Lha-bzang Khan.

However, the first army failed to acquire the Dalai Lama, having been defeated by Qing troops at Kumbum. Dzungar troops went on the rampage through Lhasa and its environs, looting, raping and killing. Soon, the Tibetans were appealing to the Kangxi Emperor to rid them of the Dzungars. The Dzungar occupation of Tibet became more difficult to sustain as time passed and though they managed to defeat a poorly organized Chinese invasion at the Battle of the Salween River in 1718, Qing troops took Lhasa in 1720 during their second and larger expedition.

After Danjung died circa 1717, allegedly at the hands of Tsewang Rabtan, Boitalak married a taisha or prince of the Khoid, a section of the Dzungar people, and later gave birth to Amursana (1723–1757), who would grow up to be Khan of Dzungaria during the reign of the Qianlong Emperor.

See also
 Dzungar–Qing War

References

Bibliography

History of Kalmykia
18th-century monarchs in Asia
17th-century Mongol rulers
1643 births
1727 deaths